Brigadier Arthur Gordon Matthew  (22 December 1898 – 6 October 1947) was a British Royal Artillery officer who served in the First World War and the Second World War.

Military career
Matthew (who was known as "Hammer") served in the First World War and in North Africa during the Second World War, including during the Siege of Tobruk and the Second Battle of El Alamein. After the Normandy campaign and the Rhine crossing, he served as commander of the Kiel Brigade area during the post-war occupation of Germany.

Matthew died in 1947 from a heart attack, but is recorded amongst the dead for the 1939–1945 conflict as occupation operations had then not yet normalised to peacetime arrangements. He is buried in the Parish of the Ascension Burial Ground in Cambridge.

He was awarded the Distinguished Service Order in 1941 for distinguished service in the Middle East between December 1940 and February 1941, and was appointed a Commander of the Most Excellent Order of the British Empire in 1945. He was also Mentioned in Despatches five times.

References

External links

British Army Officers 1939–1945
Generals of World War II

1898 births
1947 deaths
Royal Horse Artillery officers
British Army personnel of World War I
Commanders of the Order of the British Empire
Companions of the Distinguished Service Order
People from Cambridge
Military personnel from Cambridgeshire
British Army brigadiers of World War II
Graduates of the Royal Military Academy, Woolwich
People educated at Eastbourne College
Burials in Cambridgeshire